A Just Russia — For Truth (SRZP), formerly A Just Russia (SR), is a social conservative and social-democratic political party in Russia. The party, part of the "systemic opposition", is considered to be pro-Kremlin.

The party was formed on 28 October 2006 as a merger of the left-wing factions of Rodina, the Russian Party of Life and the Russian Pensioners' Party. Later, six further minor parties joined. It then called for a "New Socialism of the 21st Century" which guarantees the rights and freedoms of the individual and ensures the proper functioning of a welfare state. In 2011, Nikolai Levichev was elected as party chairman, succeeding Sergey Mironov who led the party in 2006–2011. On 27 October 2013, Mironov was re-elected as party chairman, and again on 28 October 2018. On 28 January 2021, the party merged with the For Truth and Patriots of Russia parties.

History

Name
 : A Just Russia: Motherland/Pensioners/Life (SR:RPZh)
 : A Just Russia (SR)
 since : Socialist Political Party "A Just Russia — Patriots — For Truth" (SRZP)

Establishment 
On 26 March 2006, the deputy head of the presidential administration, Vladislav Surkov, met with Sergey Mironov, then the party leader of the Party of Life, and 30 deputies from the party, where Surkov formulated the idea of building a two-party system in the country, in which the Kremlin could rely on one of two parties, the other being the ruling party, United Russia. Surkov stated: "Society has no 'second leg' to step on when the first one is numb. In Russia, a second large party is needed". Surkov suggested that the role of the "main leg" would be left to United Russia for the near future. In the meeting, Surkov also noted that in the 2003 legislative elections, United Russia received about 37% of the vote, which was about the same as the next three parties, the Communist Party, the Liberal Democratic Party, and Rodina, and said that ideally, the "second leg" should have the same level of electoral support as the three parties. According to researcher Luke March, a second party of power would incentivize United Russia to perform well, or strong performance for A Just Russia would have "Putin's influence spread all over the political field", quoting political commentator Sergei Markov.

A Just Russia formed on 28 October 2006 as a merger of three parties, namely Rodina, the Russian Party of Life and the Russian Pensioners' Party. Of these, the nationalist Rodina was the largest, having won 9% of the popular vote in the 2003 Duma elections. At the time of the merger, Rodina had 37 seats in the Duma. The Party of Pensioners had gained 3% of the vote, failing to cross the 5% election threshold and also been weakened by infighting in its leadership. The social-democratic Party of Life led by Sergey Mironov was still relatively young and had won only one regional election.

As the only party of the three with seats in the Duma, Rodina dominated the unification process. In simultaneous conventions held in Moscow on 26 August 2006, the Party of Life and the Party of Pensioners decided to join Rodina. Two months later on 28 October 2006, the new party held its founding congress which decided to change the party's name to A Just Russia. Mironov was elected the unified party's chairman while Rodina's former chairman Alexander Babakov became the secretary of the central council presidium and the leader of the Party of Pensioners Igor Zotov became secretary of the political council. The next year, A Just Russia expanded further, absorbing three additional small parties in 2007, namely the People's Party, the Party of Entrepreneurship Development and the Party of Constitutional Democrats.

At the party's founding convention, chairman Sergey Mironov expressed support for the direction given to the country by President Vladimir Putin, claiming that "we will not allow anyone to veer from it after Putin leaves his post in 2008". At the same time, he harshly criticised Putin's party United Russia and what Mironov called the largest party's "monopoly" of the nation's political, economic and administrative resources. Mironov characterised A Just Russia as a new "leftist political force" and a "hard opposition", saying that "if United Russia is the party of power, we will become the party of the people".

First election successes 

Shortly after its creation, A Just Russia participated in its first elections when the party's candidate  won the mayoral race in Samara. The March 2007 regional elections were dominated by United Russia, but A Just Russia also put up a strong performance. In particular, the new party won a majority in the regional parliament in Stavropol Krai.

The emergence of A Just Russia changed Russia's political landscape and demonstrated that the country's leadership had been split between two parties. United Russia supporters in the presidential administration grew wary of the challenge posed by A Just Russia, worrying that United Russia would lose its position as "the president's party". Before the 2007 Duma elections, the Kremlin had withdrawn its support of A Just Russia and threw its weight entirely behind United Russia.

In a press conference on 19 January 2007 dedicated to upcoming Duma elections, Secretary of the Central Party Council of A Just Russia Alexander Babakov announced that the party had approximately 300,000 members.

In May 2007, A Just Russia's chairman Sergey Mironov proposed a merger between his party and the Communist Party of the Russian Federation in order to create a new unified socialist party.

2007 Duma elections 

In the run-up to the December 2007 Duma elections, President Vladimir Putin—the country's most popular politician—explicitly and unequivocally endorsed the United Russia party and decided to head its national list. Putin's decision significantly changed the election campaign and resulted in a massive boost to United Russia's popularity. This represented a harsh blow to A Just Russia which also had hoped to ride on Putin's popularity. Polls suggested the party could have difficulties crossing the 7% election threshold.

A Just Russia appointed three persons to its national list, namely chairman Sergey Mironov; Svetlana Goryacheva (a former member of the Communist Party of the Russian Federation); and Sergey Shargunov, a 27-year-old fiction author. In its regional lists, A Just Russia had 553 candidates, taking its total number of candidates to 556. This was more than the Communists (515), but less than United Russia (600). Although originally positioned as a centre-left party, under Mironov's leadership A Just Russia campaigned as a socialist alternative to the Communists.

In the end, A Just Russia received 5,383,639 votes (7.74%), becoming the fourth party to cross the 7% election threshold and enter the Duma after United Russia, the Communists and the Liberal Democratic Party of Russia. As a result, A Just Russia got 38 of the 450 seats (8.4%) in the Duma. The party received its highest share of votes in Astrakhan (20%), Saint Petersburg (16%) and Stavropol (13%). In Saint Petersburg, the hometown of chairman Mironov, A Just Russia became the second largest party. Mironov said he would not take up his seat in the Duma himself, but instead continue as the Chairman of the Federation Council. A Just Russia's performance in the elections was a slight disappointment, especially since one of its predecessor parties, Rodina, had won 9% of the votes in the 2003 elections.

Post-election 
On 10 December 2007, A Just Russia was part of a coalition of parties which nominated Dmitry Medvedev as their candidate for the 2008 presidential elections.

On 25 April 2008, A Just Russia held its third annual congress, where the party expelled thousands of members who were not aware that they were members. The party's charter was amended at the congress to make mergers easier. The congress also disbanded the party's politburo and transferred its functions to the Central Council. Politburo's chairman Nikolai Levichev, who also heads A Just Russia's faction in the State Duma, was elected as the council's first secretary.

During its XXIII Congress On 30 June 2008, A Just Russia was accepted into the Socialist International, the worldwide organisation of social-democratic political parties.

The United Socialist Party of Russia and the Russian Ecological Party "The Greens" merged into the party in 2008.

In the 2007–2011 State Duma, A Just Russia became a strong supporter of the Medvedev modernisation programme, endorsing President Dmitry Medvedev's view that Russia must move towards a diversified post-industrial economy and democratisation of its political system. A Just Russia also advocated restoration of direct gubernatorial elections and lowering the Duma election threshold from 7% to 3%. A Just Russia voted against Prime Minister Vladimir Putin's anti-crisis plan in April 2009 and also voted against the governments budgets in 2010 and 2011. According to researcher Luke March, in the 2007–2011 Duma A Just Russia clearly moved towards Medvedev. The party has declared absolute opposition to Putin's government while remaining supportive of Medvedev.

On 2 February 2010, Mironov told talk show host Vladimir Pozner Jr. that "to say that we support Vladimir Putin in everything and personally is already outdated information", noting that the party "categorically opposed" Putin's budget. A scandal broke out with the ruling party, leading to A Just Russia and United Russia to sign a political agreement to jointly support Putin and Medvedev on certain strategic issues and agreeing to discuss disagreements between them. However, A Just Russia withdrew from the agreement a month later, with Mironov accusing United Russia of violating the agreement.

In March 2011, Mironov stated that the party would not support United Russia's candidate for the next presidential election, and that it would decide on its nomination later in the autumn. At the party congress on 16 April 2011, Nikolai Levichev was elected party leader after Mironov was removed from the position. In May 2011, Mironov was removed from his position of Chairman of the Federation Council.

In August 2011, the party published its manifesto, announcing its transition to full opposition to the authorities.

2011 Duma elections
In the 2011 legislative elections, the party received 13% of the vote, extending its number of seats to 64.

Following reports of electoral fraud at the election, party members joined in post-election protests against the results. Gennady Gudkov, a party heavyweight and deputy, was prominent at the demonstrations. Senior party members took part in demonstrations at Bolotnaya Square on 10 December, among them Gudkov and Oksana Dmitriyeva.

2012 presidential election
Mironov was nominated as the party's candidate for the 2012 presidential election. Mironov stated that he would "enter the race not to participate, but to win", and also promised to nominate Oksana Dmitriyeva as prime minister if elected. Mironov called for a return to a socialist model of government. While he stated that he predicted a Putin victory, he declared that he would support Gennady Zyuganov in a hypothetical runoff against Putin. According to election results, Mironov came in last place, with 3.85% of the vote.

Post-election
On 22 May 2012, during a State Duma session where a bill was being considered to increase fines for those who violated protest laws, Mironov wore a white ribbon, a symbol that was being used by the anti-Kremlin opposition in protests against Putin's re-election, and the party remained silent in the discussion of the bill as a sign of protest. Mironov stated that the party "fundamentally disagrees with the content of the bill".

On 27 October 2012, Mironov called on members to stop wearing the white ribbon, the day after a United Russia deputy, Alexander Sidyakin, branded deputies who wore it as "traitors" and stomped on a white ribbon. Mironov urged members to distance themselves from the opposition, claiming that the rallies turned into a "political sect". He also threatened to expel Ilya Ponomaryov and Gudkov from the party for joining the opposition's Coordination Council. Ponomaryov and Gudkov were also among the deputies who were branded as traitors by Sidyakin. From 2012, members of the party who actively took part in protests left or were expelled from the party, including Gudkov and Ponomaryov. Dmitriyeva also distanced herself from the party.

In October 2013, Mironov was elected as party leader and in 2014, A Just Russia, along with United Russia, the Communist Party, and the Liberal Democratic Party, supported Putin's foreign policy following the Annexation of Crimea, and much of his domestic policy.

2016 Duma elections 
In the 2016 legislative elections, A Just Russia received 6% of the vote, losing most of its seats and retaining only 23 seats.

2018 presidential election 
In December 2017, Mironov outlined the party's new tasks, choosing not to participate in the 2018 presidential election due to his unwillingness to fight "for second place". Instead, the party would endorse Putin and work to limit the influence of United Russia on the agenda of Putin. Mironov stated that A Just Russia was, is, and will be in opposition to United Russia, but that it could not be "in opposition to Russia herself". Mironov also proposed "to honestly tell voters" that there was no "worthy alternative" to Putin. RBC reported that, according to sources close to the party's leadership, Mironov's unwillingness to participate in the election was due to fatigue and financial difficulties.

2021 Duma elections 
Ahead of the 2021 legislative elections, A Just Russia merged with the parties Patriots of Russia and For Truth in January 2021, forming A Just Russia — Patriots — For Truth. Mironov remained party leader, and according to their unification manifesto, the party would run on "12 principles of truth, patriotism and justice", including "strengthening the role of the state in the economy, developing a progressive taxation scale, toughening punishments for corruption, increasing the minimum wage, pensions and social benefits, phasing out of the high school state exams and budget decentralization". The party also reportedly planned to come in second place in the election, after United Russia, but eventually came third, after United Russia and the Communist Party of the Russian Federation.

Post-election 
In February 2022, the party voted in favour of the recognition of the Donetsk People's Republic and the Luhansk People's Republic by the Russian Federation and later it supported the 2022 Russian invasion of Ukraine. As a result of these announcements, A Just Russia — For Truth was expelled from the Socialist International in March 2022.

In July 2022, the leader of the CPRF, Gennady Zyuganov allowed CPRF to proposed merging with A Just Russia — For Truth, but only if that party adopted the Communist program. The day before, the leader of the A Just Russia Sergey Mironov said that he "does not see any obstacles to the creation in Russia of a large coalition of left-wing patriotic forces".

Membership 
In 2012, the party claimed to have 400,000 members and claimed to be the largest left-wing party in Russia. It has regional branches in all federal subjects of Russia.

Ideology and platform 
A Just Russia calls for the creation of a welfare state with less economic inequality, but protecting individual property rights and maintaining a market economy. Under the leadership of Sergey Mironov, the party has presented itself as a socialist alternative to the Communist Party of the Russian Federation, and describes its ideology as "New Socialism of the 21st century". In the party platform, this "New Socialism" is defined as the antithesis of "barbarous, oligarchic capitalism". It represents a more individualist or liberal socialism.

Improving the socio-economic position of the average Russian is the party's primary aim. It wishes to replace Russia's 13% flat-rate income tax with progressive taxation and demands that spending on employment programmes is increased to 1% of GDP. In the State Duma, the party emphasises its role as "constructive opposition" that opposes high-level corruption and supports further democratisation of the political system. In the 2007–2011 Duma, A Just Russia declared absolute opposition to Prime Minister Vladimir Putin's government, voting against the government's budgets in 2010 and 2011 while remaining strongly supportive of President Dmitry Medvedev and his modernisation programme. Despite such position, A Just Russia endorsed Putin in the 2018 Russian presidential election.

In Russia's international relations, A Just Russia proposes moving away from the Western sphere and strengthening relations between the former Soviet states.

Chairmen

A Just Russia

A Just Russia — For Truth

International cooperation 
A Just Russia used to be a full member of the Socialist International, but on 7 March 2022 the party was expelled for its support of the Russian invasion of Ukraine.

It also maintains friendly relations with Latin American left-wing political parties. A Just Russia repeatedly sent greetings to annual meetings of São Paulo Forum.

Electoral results

Presidential

State Duma

Mergers 
The following parties have merged into A Just Russia. The dates in brackets show when the merger took place and when it ended.
Patriots of Russia (January 2021)
For Truth (January 2021)
Party of Social Justice (September 2008)
 United Socialist Party of Russia (May 2007)
People's Party of the Russian Federation (April 2007)
Party of Entrepreneurship Development (2007)
Party of Constitutional Democrats (2007)
The Greens (June 2009 – February 2012; re-established as an independent party in 2012)
Rodina (October 2006 – September 2012; re-established as an independent party in 2012)
 Russian Pensioners' Party (October 2006 – April 2012; re-established as an independent party in 2012)
Russian Party of Life (October 2006)

References

Literature

External links 
 
  
 Website of Moscow oblast regional committee 
 A Just Russia prepares the International day of the UN  on the website of the WSIS 

 
Registered political parties in Russia
Political parties established in 2006
2006 establishments in Russia
Centrist parties in Russia
Centre-left parties in Europe
Conservative parties in Russia
Social conservative parties
Social democratic parties in Russia
Socialist International
Democratic socialist parties in Europe